Belmont Finance Corp Ltd v Williams Furniture Ltd (No 2) [1980] 1 All ER 393 is an English trusts law case, concerning breach of trust and dishonest assistance.

Facts
Belmont Finance Corp was wholly owned by City Industrial Finance, Mr James the chairman of both. Belmont’s directors paid £500,000 under a scheme to help Maximum Co, owned and controlled by Mr Grosscurth, to buy shares in Belmont from City. This was a breach of fiduciary duty and breach of the prohibition on financial assistance. City received £489,000 ultimately. Belmont later claimed City was liable to account as a constructive trustee.

Judgment
The Court of Appeal held that City Industrial Finance was liable to account. Buckley LJ noted Barnes v Addy to mean that a stranger who receives some of the trust or assists with knowledge of facts in a dishonest design will be liable.

Goff LJ concurred.

Waller LJ concurred.

See also

English trusts law

Notes

References

English trusts case law
Court of Appeal (England and Wales) cases
1980 in British law
1980 in case law